Forsaken is the debut album from the Irish three piece indie/ art rock band, Hail the Ghost, which was released independently on March 6, 2015 on CD and Digital formats. The music on the album was described as "ambient, cinematic alternative rock" by lead singer and songwriter, Kieran O'Reilly.

Recording
The album was recorded, mixed and mastered in JAM Studios, Kells, Co. Meath in Ireland between January 2014 and January 2015. The album was Produced by Kieran O'Reilly and Martin Quinn.

Album artwork
The artwork for the album was a photograph taken by O'Reilly's on-screen Love/Hate co-star, Brían F. O'Byrne, who took the photograph of his youngest daughter, Oona, while at home in Cavan. The image is entitled "Oona hears a noise".

Album release

Critical reception
The album received favourable reviews; Tony Clayton-Lea (The Irish Times) wrote a review on the album for HMV stating, "Hail The Ghost comes across not so much a side or vanity project as a bona fide artistic statement." The album was acknowledged well critically with Hotpress Magazine stating, "The playing throughout is impeccable, and the production pristine, with every instrument allowed to breathe naturally. The overall effect is one of gorgeous contemplative calm. Excellent." The Irish Independent's review of the album included, "Forsaken is unambiguously from the heart" and the "unremitting bleakness is curiously endearing." Dublin Concerts described the album as an "Impossibly beautiful album". The Sunday Times referred to Hail the Ghost as "A winningly downbeat ensemble." Hail the Ghost also performed at Ireland's Electric Picnic Festival 2015

Charts
Forsaken reached number 2 in the Irish Alternative iTunes Chart in its first week and following an appearance on The Saturday Night Show, the album re-entered the Alternative Irish Charts at number 7 and climbed to number 3 in the Irish Alternative iTunes Chart. Forsaken peaked at number 67 in the Irish National Music Charts

Personnel 

Hail the Ghost
Kieran O'Reilly – Vocals, Backing Vocals, Drums & Guitar
Eamonn Young – Guitars
Ian Corr – Piano/Keyboards

Additional contributors
Martin Quinn - Bass Guitar, Electric/Acoustic Guitars and Keyboards
Joe Harney (Deaf Joe) – Backing Vocals on 'Headstoned' and 'Drift' 

Technical Personnel
Producer – Kieran O'Reilly & Martin Quinn
Engineer/Mixer – Martin Quinn
Mastering – Martin Quinn 

Live musicians
Kieran O'Reilly – Vocals & Guitar
Eamonn Young – Guitar
Ian Corr – Keyboards
Martin Quinn – Bass & Backing Vocals
Paul Higgins – Guitars
Gavin Mulhall – Drums

Track listing

Notes

2015 albums
Hail The Ghost albums